Nabi Abdurakhmanov is Uzbekistani theatre producer and director.

Biography 
Nabi Abdurakhmanov lives in the USA since 2016. He gives masterclasses and produces productions in Stella Adler Studio (Phaeton by M.Milligan), NYU Tisch School of the Arts (Three Sisters by A.Chekhov) and York College of CUNY.

Career

Theatre 
Nabi Abdurakhmanov was the artistic director of the Youth Theatre of Uzbekistan from 1991 till 2016. Abdurakhmanov was a professor of acting and directing at the Uzbekistan State Institute of Arts and Culture since 1980. He was also the chairman of the Uzbek Center of International Association of Theatres for Children and Youth since 1997.

Theatre director works 
 1998 'A Girl With Matches' after Hans Christian Andersen. Moscow Pushkin Drama Theatre
 2016 'Worlds In Collision' by Iddo Netanyahu. Academic Drama Theatre. Vladimir, Russia
 2018 'Vox in deserto' by Did Tal. Youth Theatre of Uzbekistan.
 2019 'Sodom and Gomorrah XXI' by Djalol Yusupov. Chekhov International Theatre Festival.

Movie acting 
 1972 The testament of the old master (mini-series) as Sadik Sabirov
 1991 Step to the right ... step to the left.

References

External links
 

1958 births
Living people
People from Tashkent
Uzbekistani theatre directors
Uzbekistani theatre people